Sebastian Vettel is a German former racing driver who won four Formula One World Championships. The final two seasons of Vettel's Formula One career saw him drive for the Aston Martin team.

His first Grand Prix win came in the rain-affected  on 14 September; Vettel became the youngest driver to win a Formula One race at 21 years, 2 months and 11 days. He won four races in his first season with Red Bull in 2009 and finished runner-up to Jenson Button. Vettel took a further 34 victories with Red Bull in his four world championship winning seasons. His 2013 season included 13 Grand Prix victories, which equalled seven-time world champion Michael Schumacher's record for most wins in a season. The 2014 season was the first since his debut year that Vettel did not achieve a race victory.

Vettel is currently ranked third in the all-time Formula One Grand Prix winners' list with 53 victories from 299 starts; the majority of his race victories (38) came with Red Bull; he has also won 14 races with Ferrari and 1 for Toro Rosso. His most successful circuit is the Marina Bay Street Circuit, the host track of the Singapore Grand Prix, where he has won 5 times, with 8 podium finishes in 12 races.

Wins 

Key:
 No. – Victory number; for example, "1" signifies Vettel's first race win.
 Race – Race number in Vettel's Formula One career; for example "75" signifies Vettel's 75th Formula One race.
 Grid – The position on the grid from which Vettel started the race.
 Margin – Margin of victory, given in the format of minutes:seconds.milliseconds
  – Driver's Championship winning season.

Number of wins at different Grands Prix

Vettel has won at 21 out of 39 different  he has partaken in. The 70th Anniversary Grand Prix, the Austrian Grand Prix, the Azerbaijan Grand Prix, the Dutch Grand Prix, the Emilia Romagna Grand Prix, the Eifel Grand Prix, the French Grand Prix, the Mexican Grand Prix, the Mexico City Grand Prix, the Miami Grand Prix, the Portuguese Grand Prix, the Qatar Grand Prix, the Russian Grand Prix, the Sakhir Grand Prix, the Saudi Arabian Grand Prix, the Styrian Grand Prix and the Tuscan Grand Prix are the events he has entered and not won.

Number of wins at different circuits
Vettel has won at 21 out of 37 different race tracks he has competed on. The Algarve International Circuit, the Autódromo Hermanos Rodríguez, the Baku City Circuit, the Circuit de Nevers Magny-Cours, the Circuit Paul Ricard, Circuit Zandvoort, the Hockenheimring, Fuji Speedway, the Imola Circuit, the Indianapolis Motor Speedway, the Jeddah Corniche Circuit, the Losail International Circuit, the Miami International Autodrome, Mugello Circuit, the Red Bull Ring and the Sochi Autodrom are the circuits he has driven and not won an event.

See also
 List of Formula One Grand Prix winners

Notes

References

External links
 Drivers: Hall of Fame: Sebastian Vettel
 Sebastian Vettel: Involvement from Stats F1

Vettel, Sebastian
2000s in motorsport
2000s-related lists
2010s in motorsport
2010s-related lists
2020s in motorsport
2020s-related lists
Sebastian Vettel